NH5 can refer to:

 National Highway 5 (Cambodia)
 National Highway 5 (Djibouti)
 National Highway 5 (India)
 National Highway 5 (India)(old numbering)
 N-5 National Highway

See also 

 List of highways numbered 5